Jim Corbett National Park is a national park in India located in the Nainital district of  Uttarakhand state. The first national park in India, it was established in 1936 during the British Raj and named Hailey National Park after William Malcolm Hailey, a governor of the United Provinces in which it was then located. In 1956, nearly a decade after India's independence, it was renamed Corbett National Park after the hunter and naturalist Jim Corbett, who had played a leading role in its establishment and had died the year before.  The park was the first to come under the Project Tiger initiative.

Corbett National Park comprises  area of hills, riverine belts, marshy depressions, grasslands and a large lake. Winter nights are cold but the days are bright and sunny. It rains from July to September. The park has sub-Himalayan belt geographical and ecological characteristics. Dense moist deciduous forest mainly consists of sal, haldu, peepal, rohini and mango trees. Forest covers almost 73% of the park, while 10% of the area consists of grasslands. It houses around 110 tree species, 50 species of mammals, 580 bird species and 25 reptile species.

An ecotourism destination, the park contains 488 different species of plants and a diverse variety of fauna. The increase in tourist activities, among other problems, continues to present a serious challenge to the park's ecological balance.

History
Some areas of the park were formerly part of the princely state of Tehri Garhwal. The forests were cleared by the Environment and Forests Department (Uttarakhand) to make the area less vulnerable to Rohilla invaders. The Raja of Tehri formally ceded a part of his princely state to the East India Company in return for their assistance in ousting the Gurkhas from his domain. The Buksas—a tribe from the Terai—settled on the land and began growing crops, but in the early 1860s they were evicted with the advent of British rule.

Efforts to save the forests of the region began in the 19th century under Major Ramsay, the British Officer who was in-charge of the area during those times. The first step in the protection of the area began in 1868 when the British forest department established control over the land and prohibited cultivation and the operation of cattle stations. In 1879 these forests were constituted into a reserve forest where restricted felling was permitted.

In the early 1900s, several Britishers, including E. R. Stevans and E. A. Smythies, suggested the setting up of a national park on this soil. The British administration considered the possibility of creating a game reserve there in 1907. It was only in the 1930s that the process of demarcation for such an area got underway. A reserve area known as Hailey National Park covering  was created in 1936, when Sir Malcolm Hailey was the Governor of United Provinces; and Asia's first national park came into existence. Hunting was not allowed in the reserve, only timber cutting for domestic purposes. Soon after the establishment of the reserve, rules prohibiting killing and capturing of mammals, reptiles and birds within its boundaries were passed.

The reserve was renamed in 1954–55 as Ramganga National Park and was again renamed in 1955–56 as Corbett National Park, after author and naturalist Jim Corbett.

The park fared well during the 1930s under an elected administration. But, during the Second World War, it suffered from excessive poaching and timber cutting. Over time, the area in the reserve was increased— were added in 1991 as a buffer zone to the Corbett Tiger Reserve. The 1991 addition included the entire Kalagarh forest division, assimilating the  area of Sonanadi Wildlife Sanctuary as a part of the Kalagarh division. It was chosen in 1974 as the location for launching the Project Tiger wildlife conservation project. The reserve is administered from its headquarters in the Nainital district.

Corbett National Park is one of the thirteen protected areas covered by the World Wide Fund For Nature under their Terai Arc Landscape Program. The program aims to protect three of the five terrestrial flagship species, the tiger, the Asian elephant and the great one-horned rhinoceros, by restoring corridors of forest to link 13 protected areas of Nepal and India, to enable wildlife migration.

Geography 

The park is located between 29°25' and 29°39'N latitude and between 78°44' and 79°07'E longitude. It has numerous ravines, ridges, minor streams and small plateaus with varying aspects and degrees of slope. The park encompasses the Patli Dun valley formed by the Ramganga river. It protects parts of the Upper Gangetic Plains moist deciduous forests and Himalayan subtropical pine forests ecoregions. It has a humid subtropical and highland climate.

The core area forms the Jim Corbett National Park while the buffer contains reserve forests as well as the Sonanadi Wildlife Sanctuary.

The reserve, located partly along a valley between the Lesser Himalaya in the north and the Shivaliks in the south, has a sub-Himalayan belt structure. The upper tertiary rocks are exposed towards the base of the Shiwalik range and hard sandstone units form broad ridges. Characteristic longitudinal valleys, geographically termed Doons, or Duns can be seen formed along the narrow tectonic zones between lineaments.

Climate 

The weather in the park is temperate compared to most other protected areas of India. Summer temperatures normally do not rise above . Rainfall ranges from light during the winter to heavy during the monsoonal summer.

Flora 
A total of 488 different species of plants have been recorded in the park. Tree density inside the reserve is higher in the areas of Sal forests and lowest in the Anogeissus-Acacia catechu forests. Total tree basal cover is greater in Sal dominated areas of woody vegetation. Healthy regeneration in sapling and seedling layers is occurring in the Mallotus philippensis, Jamun and Diospyros tomentosa communities, but in the Sal forests the regeneration of sapling and seedling is poor.

Fauna 

More than 586 species of resident and migratory birds have been categorised, including the crested serpent eagle, blossom-headed parakeet and the red junglefowl — ancestor of all domestic fowl. 33 species of reptiles, seven species of amphibians, seven species of fish and 36 species of dragonflies have also been recorded.

Bengal tigers, although plentiful, are not easily spotted due to the abundance of foliage - camouflage - in the reserve. Thick jungle, the Ramganga river and plentiful prey make this reserve an ideal habitat for tigers who are opportunistic feeders and prey upon a range of animals. The tigers in the park have been known to kill much larger animals such as buffalo and even elephant for food. The tigers prey upon the larger animals in rare cases of food shortage. There have been incidents of tigers attacking domestic animals in times of shortage of prey.

Leopards are found in hilly areas but may also venture into the low land jungles. Small cats in the park include the jungle cat, fishing cat and leopard cat. Other mammals include barking deer, sambar deer, hog deer and chital, sloth and Himalayan black bears, Indian grey mongoose, otters, yellow-throated martens, Himalayan goral, Indian pangolins, and langur and rhesus macaques. Owls and nightjars can be heard during the night.

In the summer, Indian elephants can be seen in herds of several hundred. The Indian python found in the reserve is a dangerous species, capable of killing a chital deer. Local crocodiles and gharials were saved from extinction by captive breeding programs that subsequently released crocodiles into the Ramganga river.

Ecotourism 

Though the main focus is protection of wildlife, the reserve management has also encouraged ecotourism. In 1993, a training course covering natural history, visitor management and park interpretation was introduced to train nature guides. A second course followed in 1995 which recruited more guides for the same purpose. This allowed the staff of the reserve, previously preoccupied with guiding the visitors, to carry out management activities uninterrupted. Additionally, the Indian government has organised workshops on ecotourism in Corbett National Park and Garhwal region to ensure that the local citizens profit from tourism while the park remains protected.

patil & Joshi (1997) consider summer (April–June) to be the best season for Indian tourists to visit the park while recommending the winter months (November–January) for foreign tourists. According to Riley & Riley (2005): "Best chances of seeing a tiger to come late in the dry season- April to mid-June-and go out with mahouts and elephants for several days."

As early as 1991, the Corbett National Park played host to 3237 tourist vehicles carrying 45,215 visitors during the main tourist seasons between 15 November and 15 June. This heavy influx of tourists has led to visible stress signs on the natural ecosystem. Excessive trampling of soil due to tourist pressure has led to reduction in plant species and has also resulted in reduced soil moisture. The tourists have increasingly used fuel wood for cooking. This is a cause of concern as this fuel wood is obtained from the nearby forests, resulting in greater pressure on the forest ecosystem of the park. Additionally, tourists have also caused problems by making noise, littering and causing disturbances in general.

In 2007, the naturalist and photographer Kahini Ghosh Mehta made the first comprehensive travel guide on Corbett National Park. The film, titled Wild Saga of Corbett, shows how tourists can contribute to conservation efforts.

Other attractions
Dhikala is situated at the fringes of Patli Dun valley. There is a rest house, which was built hundred of years ago. Kanda ridge forms the backdrop, and from Dhikala, there are views of the valley.
Kalagarh Dam is located in the south-west of the wildlife sanctuary. Many migratory waterfowl come here in the winters.
The falls are surrounded by dense forests.
Garjiya Devi Temple is sacred to Garjiya Devi and is mostly visited during the Kartik Purnima (November – December). It is located on the bank of the river Kosi, amidst the hilly terrains of Uttarakhand, nearby Garjiya village, at a distance of 14 km. from Ramnagar, Uttarakhand, India.

In popular culture
The 2005 Bollywood movie Kaal has a plot set in the Jim Corbett National Park. The movie was filmed at the park as well.

In August 2019, Prime Minister of India Narendra Modi appeared in a special episode of Discovery Channel's show Man vs Wild with the host Bear Grylls, where he trekked the jungles and talked about nature and wildlife conservation with Grylls. The episode was filmed in Jim Corbett National Park and broadcast in 180 countries along India.

Challenges

Past 

The consequences ranged from local extinction of swamp deer to a massive reduction in hog deer population. The reservoir formed due to the submerging of land has also led to an increase in aquatic fauna and has additionally served as a habitat for winter migrants.

Two villages situated on the southern boundary were shifted to the Firozpur–Manpur area situated on Ramnagar–Kashipur highway during 1990–93; the vacated areas were designated as buffer zones. The families in these villages were mostly dependent on forest products. With the passage of time, these areas began to show signs of ecological recovery. Vines, herbs, grasses and small trees began to appear, followed by herbaceous flora, eventually leading to natural forest type. It was observed that grass began to grow on the vacated agricultural fields and the adjoining forest areas started recuperating. By 1999–2002 several plant species emerged in these buffer zones. The newly arisen lush green fields attracted grass eating animals, mainly deer and elephants, who slowly migrated towards these areas and even preferred to stay there throughout the monsoon.

There were 109 cases of poaching recorded in 1988–89. This figure dropped to 12 reported cases in 1997–98.

In 1985 David Hunt, a British ornithologist and birdwatching tour guide, was killed by a tiger in the park.

Present 

The habitat of the reserve faces threats from invasive species such as the exotic weeds  Lantana, Parthenium and Cassia.

The villages surrounding the park are at least 15–20 years old and no new villages have come up in the recent past. Incidents of killing cattle by tigers and leopards have led to acts of retaliation by the local population in some cases. The Indian government has approved the construction of a  stone masonry wall on the southern boundary of the reserve where it comes in direct contact with agricultural fields.

In April 2008, the National Conservation Tiger Authority (NCTA) expressed serious concern that protection systems have weakened, and poachers have infiltrated into this park. Monitoring of wild animals in the prescribed format has not been followed despite advisories and observations made during field visits. Also the monthly monitoring report of field evidence relating to tigers has not been received since 2006. NCTA said that in the "absence of ongoing monitoring protocol in a standardised manner, it would be impossible to forecast and keep track of untoward happenings in the area targeted by poachers." A cement road has been built through the park against a Supreme Court order. The road has become a thoroughfare between Kalagarh and Ramnagar. Constantly increasing vehicle traffic on this road is affecting the wildlife of crucial ranges like Jhirna, Kotirau and Dhara.

As of 10 February 2014, nine local villagers are reported to have been killed by tigers originating from Jim Corbett National Park wildlife sanctuary opened a new zone for tourists stretched across 521 km2

Ecosystem valuation 
An economic assessment study of Jim Corbett Tiger Reserve estimated its annual flow benefits to be 14.7 billion (1.14 lakh / hectare). Important ecosystem services included gene-pool protection (10.65 billion), provisioning of water to downstream districts of Uttar Pradesh (1.61 billion), water purification services to the city of New Delhi (550 million), employment for local communities (82 million), provision of habitat and refugia for wildlife (274 million) and sequestration of carbon (214 million).

See also 

 Indomalayan realm
 Critically endangered species
 Leopard of Rudraprayag
 Champawat Tiger
 Rajaji National Park
 Man-Eaters of Kumaon and other literary references to Nainital
 Indian Council of Forestry Research and Education
 Arid Forest Research Institute
 Indian Council of Forestry Research and Education

Notes

References

Further reading

External links 

 Corbett Tiger Reserve — official website
 Map of the park provided by Project Tiger Directorate, Ministry of Environment, Govt of India.
 Expert Bulletin 
  "Corbett National Park." Encyclopædia Britannica. 2007. Encyclopædia Britannica Online. 12 October 2007
 "Corbett National Park," Microsoft Encarta Online Encyclopedia 2007. (Archived 2009-10-31)

Tiger reserves of India
Nainital district
National parks in Uttarakhand
Protected areas established in 1936
1936 establishments in India
Elephant reserves of India